Just One Time is a 1999 feature length comedy film, written and directed by Lane Janger. It is also a 1998 short film by the same director on which the long feature was based on.

1998: Just One Time (short)

The film Just One Time is based on an 8-minute short film of the same name produced in 1998 in which a man wants his girlfriend to have a sexual relationship with another girl, just one time. It was written and directed by Lane Janger and includes Guillermo Díaz (as Victor), Jennifer Esposito (as Michelle), Joelle Carter (as Amy) and 
Lane Langer (as Anthony)

Award
The short won aGLIFF Award in "Best Boy's Short" category at the Austin Gay & Lesbian International Film Festival.

1999: Just One Time (feature film)

The film Just One Time was screened at the 1998 Toronto International Film Festival. Janger is the star, writer, and director; and he plays lead role as Anthony.  It also stars Joelle Carter as Amy, Guillermo Díaz as Victor, and Jennifer Esposito as Michelle.

Synopsis
Film is about sexual orientation plays. The fiancée of a fireman reluctantly agrees to participate in a "menage a trois" with another woman, a sexual fantasy of his. She agrees to the arrangement, but insists to turn the table on him. She suggests that he agree to reciprocate by having a one time relationship with another man. This ultimately puts the impending marriage of the two in jeopardy.

Cast
Lane Janger as Anthony
Joelle Carter as Amy
Guillermo Díaz as Victor
Jennifer Esposito as Michelle
Vincent Laresca as Nick
Domenick Lombardozzi as Cyrill
David Lee Russek as Dom
Mickey Cottrell as Father Sebastian
Jerran Friedman as Young Man in Bathroom (credited as Jerran Marshall)
Anthony Gestone as Club dancer
Hazelle Goodman as Discussion leader in Ladies' bookstore
Harley Kaplan as Fireboy's Friend
Susan Kellermann as Nava Hannibal (Amy's Mom)
Priscilla Lopez as Victor's Mother
Ajay Mehta as Husan NY Deli owner
Pat Moya as Mona
Chris Stewart as Bartender
André Vippolis	as Fireboy

Award nomination
1999: Nomination for "Best Producer" for film producer Jasmine Kosovic during the Independent Spirit Awards. It was jointly for the film Just One Time and another film she had produced, namely The Adventures of Sebastian Cole

External links

1999 films
1999 LGBT-related films
1999 comedy films
American LGBT-related films
Films scored by David Michael Frank
1990s English-language films
1990s American films